Odesa Governorate, was a territorial division of the Ukrainian SSR (Ukraine) that was created in January 1920 by a decision of the All-Ukrainian Revolutionary Committee (Soviet regime). The new governorate was initially created from the western part of the Kherson Governorate (which was later renamed Mykolaiv Governorate, and then merged with the rest of Odesa Governorate).

The western parts of the Odesa Governorate would serve as the foundation for the Moldavian Autonomous Soviet Socialist Republic in 1924. 

In 1925 Odesa Governorate was dissolved during the administrative reform of 1925.

Subdivisions
A governorate was divided into counties (Russian uezd; Ukrainian povit).
 Ananiv county (1920–21)
 Balta county (1920–23)
 Voznesensk county
 Odesa county
 Pershomaisk county
 Tiraspol county

Former Mykolaiv Governorate
 Dnipro county
 Yelyzavetgrad county
 Mykolaiv county
 Kherson county

References

 
Governorates of Ukraine
History of Odesa Oblast
History of Mykolaiv Oblast
1920 establishments in Ukraine
1925 disestablishments in Ukraine